The 2014 IHF Women's Youth World Championship was the fifth edition of the tournament and took place in Macedonia from 20 July to 3 August 2014.

Romania won the final and their first title by defeating Germany 32–21. Denmark secured the bronze medal after defeating Montenegro 20–19.

Teams
Africa
 
 
 
Americas
 
 
 
Asia
 
 
 
 
 
Europe
 
 
 
 
 
 
 
 
 
 
 
 
 
Oceania
 No teams qualified

Preliminary round
The schedule was published on 20 June.

All times are local (UTC+2).

Group A

Group B

Group C

Group D

Knockout stage

Championship

Eighthfinals

Germany won the shootout 4–3.

Quarterfinals

Semifinals

Bronze medal game

Final

5–8th place playoffs

5–8th place semifinals

Seventh place game

Fifth place game

9th–16th place playoffs

9th–16th place quarterfinals

9th–12th place semifinals

Eleventh place game

Ninth place game

13th–16th place playoffs

13th–16th place semifinals

Norway won the shootout 3–1.

15th place game

13th place game

17th–20th place playoffs

17th–20th place semifinals

19th place game

17th place game

21st–24th place playoffs

21st–24th place semifinals

23rd place game

21st place game

Ranking and statistics

Final ranking

Awards
MVP

Topscorer
 (81 goals)

All-star team
Goalkeeper: 
Right wing: 
Right back: 
Central back: 
Left back: 
Left wing: 
Pivot: 
Chosen by team officials and IHF experts: IHF.info

Topscorers

Source: IHF.info

Top goalkeepers

Source: IHF.info

References

External links
Official website

2014 Women's Youth World Handball Championship
Women's Youth World Handball Championship
2014
Women's handball in North Macedonia
Youth World Handball Championship
July 2014 sports events in Europe
August 2014 sports events in Europe